The Mazda Xedos is a range of executive cars that were launched by Japanese manufacturer Mazda in 1992.

The original model was the Mazda Xedos 6, which was similar in size and in engine to the BMW 3 Series. The Xedos 6 has two types of engines - 24 valve V6 @ 144 hp named KF and 16 valve L4 @ 107 hp named B6. In 1994, Xedos Mazda renewed the Xedos 6 model with changes in engine ecological standards and body exterior. 
 
The Xedos 6 was marketed as the Eunos 500 in Japan and Australia. This vehicle was not sold in the United States and Canada. The total quantity of Xedos 6 and Eunos 500 manufactured is 72101.

By 1994, there was a larger model called the Mazda Xedos 9, which was of a similar size to the BMW 5 Series. The Xedos 9 was marketed as the Eunos 800 in Japan and Australia, and as the Mazda Millenia in the United States.

Neither version of the Xedos was popular, and a facelift in 1998 did little to improve matters. Production ceased in 2000.

References

Mazda
Xedos